Psorosa lacteomarginata is a species of snout moth. It is found on Sardinia.

References

Moths described in 1888
Phycitini
Endemic fauna of Italy
Moths of Europe